President Lee may refer to:

Harold B. Lee (1899–1973), president of the Church of Jesus Christ of Latter-day Saints
Lee Myung-bak (born 1941), 10th president of South Korea
Richard Henry Lee (1732–1794), president of the Confederation Congress and president pro tempore of the United States Senate
Syngman Lee (1875–1965), 1st president of South Korea
Lee Teng-hui (born 1923), president of the Republic of China

See also
Lee (surname)
Prime Minister Lee (disambiguation)